A Day to Remember is an American rock band.

A Day to Remember may also refer to:

 A Day to Remember (1953 film), a 1953 British film
 A Day to Remember (1991 film), a 1991 French film
 A Day to Remember (EP), an EP by A Day to Remember